Coelopina is a genus of kelp flies in the family Coelopidae.

Species
Coelopina anomala (Cole, 1923)

References

Coelopidae
Sciomyzoidea genera